St. Brendan's Hospital was a psychiatric facility located in the north Dublin suburb of Grangegorman. It formed part of the mental health services of Dublin North East with its catchment area being North West Dublin. It is now the site of a modern mental health facility known as the "Phoenix Care Centre". Since the official opening of the Richmond Lunatic Asylum in 1815 the Grangegorman site has continuously provided institutional facilities for the reception of the mentally ill until the present day. As such the Phoenix Care Centre represents the continuation of the oldest public psychiatric facility in Ireland.

History
In 1810, the governors of the Dublin House of Industry, together with the physician Andrew Jackson, succeeded in gaining a grant from the government to establish a separate asylum from the House of Industry. It was built on a site adjacent to the House of Industry and officially opened as the Richmond Lunatic Asylum in 1815, although it had received its first patients from the lunatic wards of the House of Industry in the previous year. It was named after Charles Lennox, 4th Duke of Richmond, Lord Lieutenant of Ireland. Initially, it was established as a national asylum to receive curable lunatics from throughout the island of Ireland. The facility joined the state system as a "district asylum", as defined in the Lunacy (Ireland) Act 1821, in 1830. Thereafter it was renamed the Richmond District Lunatic Asylum and its catchment area was defined as the city and county of Dublin, the counties of Wicklow, Louth, Meath, and the town of Drogheda.

In the latter years of the First World War, a facility known as the Richmond War Hospital was established in the grounds of the hospital. The War Office closed the war hospital in winter 1919. The main facility became the Grangegorman Mental Hospital in 1925 and St. Brendan's Hospital in 1958.

After the introduction of deinstitutionalisation in the late 1980s the hospital went into a period of decline. In the 2008 Report of the Inspector of Mental Health Services it was recommended that acute admissions to the secure units 3A and 3B should cease due to their unsuitability and all admissions should be redirected to the new purpose built unit at Connolly Hospital. In June 2010, the Mental Health Commission instructed the hospital to stop the admission of acute patients on account of the "entirely unacceptable and inhumane conditions". After many of the patients had been transferred to Connolly Hospital, the older facilities at St Brendan's Hospital were retired in November 2010.

As part of the Grangegorman Development Plan, where a large portion of the site of the old hospital will be used to develop the new Technological University Dublin campus, new modern psychiatric facilities were developed. A new state of the art "Phoenix Care Centre", comprising 54 bedrooms and ensuites, recreational rooms, clinical rooms, administration areas, seclusion rooms and therapy gardens, opened in March 2013.

Medical superintendents
Medical superintendents included:

 Dr. Joseph Lalor (1857-1886)
 Dr. Conolly Norman (1886-1908)
 Dr. John O'Conor Donelan (1908-1937)
 Prof. John Dunne (1937-1966)
 Prof. Ivor W. Browne (1966-1995)

Association football clubs
Since at least the 1920s various association football teams, including hospital works teams, played in the hospital grounds. These have included Grangegorman F.C. who were FAI Junior Cup finalists in 1928–29 and Leinster Senior Cup finalists in 1946–47. St. Brendan's F.C. were members of the League of Ireland B Division during the 1970s and 1980s. More recently Brendanville F.C., founded in 1963, were members of the Leinster Senior League. All three teams also played in the FAI Cup.

Gallery

References

Further reading
Culliton, Gary, 'Irish College formed for Irish psychiatrists (at last)' in Irish Medical Times (20 January 2009).
Estate Management Department Eastern Health Board, Draft Proposal for the Future of St. Brendan's Hospital, Grangegorman (Dublin, 1998).
Ferlier, Ophélie, 'St. Ita's Hospital, Portrane, and the development of mental hospitals in Ireland' in National Inventory of Architectural Heritage (Accessed 14.02.2011).
Finnane, Mark, Insanity and the Insane in Post-Famine Ireland (London, 1981).
Grangegorman Development Agency Act, 2005.
Health Service Executive, Mental Health Services in Dublin North West in Health Service Executive (HSE) website (Accessed 14.02.2011).
Kelly, Brendan D., 'Learning disability and forensic mental healthcare in 19th century Ireland' in Irish Psychological Medicine, 25(3) (2008), pp 116–8.
Kelly, Brendan D., 'Mental health law in Ireland, 1821 to 1902: building the asylums' in Medico-Legal Journal 76 (2008), pp 19–25.
Kelly, Brendan D., 'One hundred years ago: The Richmond Asylum, Dublin in 1907' in Irish Journal of Psychological Medicine 24(3) (2007), pp 108–114.
Malcolm, Elizabeth, 'Ireland's crowded madhouses: the institutional confinement of the insane in nineteenth- and twentieth-century Ireland' in Roy Porter and David Wright (eds), The Confinement of the Insane: International Perspectives, 1800-1965 (Cambridge, 2003), pp 315–33.
Mental Health Commission, Annual Report 2009 including the Report of the Inspector of Mental Health Services (Dublin, 2010).
Moylan, Thomas King, 'The district of Grangegorman' in 7(1) (Dec., 1944 - Feb., 1945), pp 1–15.
O'Laughlin, Michael C., The Families of County Dublin Ireland (Kansas City, 1999), p. 33.
Pilgrim, Charles J., 'Schools for the insane' in The Popular Science Monthly (September, 1891), pp 634–5.
Railway Procurement Agency, Luas Broombridge Environmental Impact Statement (Dublin, n.d.).
Walsh, Dermot, A Nation Once Again in The International Initiative for Mental Health Leadership (IIMHL) in Ireland website (Accessed 14.02.2011).

External links
 Grangegorman Community Museum
 Mental Health Historical Collection at St Brendan's Hospital Dublin
 Grangegorman Development Agency
 Images of Grangegorman Mental Hospital, Lower House

Hospitals in Dublin (city)
Hospital buildings completed in 1815
Hospitals established in 1815
Brendans
Brendans
Health Service Executive hospitals